This is a list of members of the Tasmanian House of Assembly between the 1861 elections and the 1862 elections.

  In October 1861, John Davies, one of the five members for Hobart Town, resigned. Charles Meredith won the resulting by-election on 28 October 1861.
  On 23 October 1861, Samuel Hill, one of the five members for Hobart Town, died. Robert Adams won the resulting by-election on 4 November 1861.
  In April 1862, Douglas Kilburn, one of the five members for Hobart Town, resigned. Maxwell Miller won the resulting by-election on 28 May 1862.
  In April 1862, Thomas Field, the member for Westbury, resigned. Adye Douglas was elected unopposed on 30 May 1862.
  In May 1862, William Archer, the member for Devon, resigned. John Davies was elected unopposed on 25 June 1862.

Sources
 
 Parliament of Tasmania (2020). The Parliament of Tasmania from 1856

Members of Tasmanian parliaments by term
19th-century Australian politicians